The Scottish Submarine Centre (SSC) is a submarine naval museum in west Scotland.

History
It opened on 11 November 2017.

Structure
It is situated on the A818.

See also
 Royal Navy Submarine Museum in Gosport, Hampshire

References

External links
 Scottish Submarine Centre
 Visit Scotland

2017 establishments in Scotland
Helensburgh
Military and war museums in Scotland
Museums established in 2017
Naval museums in the United Kingdom
Submarine museums